Societatea Ortodoxă Națională a Femeilor Române (SONFR) was a Romanian organisation for women's rights, founded in 1910. It was one of the three largest women's rights organizations in Romania, alongside Liga Drepturile si Datoriile Femeii and Liga Femeilor Române. It was an organization for conservative women.

References

 The Oxford Encyclopedia of Women in World History, Volym 1

Organizations established in 1910
1910 establishments in Romania
Women's rights organizations
Women's organizations based in Romania
Women's suffrage in Romania